Chuck Vincent (born Charles Vincent Dingley, September 6, 1940 – September 23, 1991) was an American pornographic film and B movie producer, screenwriter, editor and director.

Career 
Vincent was born on September 6, 1940, in Michigan. His father, Charles Dingley (Carmelo Dingli), was an immigrant from Rabat, Malta.

Vincent began his career in the 1960s in regional theater and Off-Broadway, doing work in a wide variety of behind-the-scenes jobs and positions for 12 years, including at theater companies such as the Negro Ensemble Company, where he was a set designer, and he also spent 5 years as a stage manager at the Tappan Zee Playhouse.

In 1970 he made his first short film, which he called The Appointment. He then moved on to doing feature-length softcore and hardcore pornography films. He was noted as one of the more sophisticated film makers in the industry. His most highly regarded work was his 1981 film Roommates, which received wide acclaim both in the porn industry and the mainstream press.

In the middle 1980s, Vincent moved away from hardcore to B movies. At one point he had a partnership with the Playboy Channel, where he produced content for their network. Preppies was the first film of the partnership. Vincent frequently cast Veronica Hart in major roles in his films. He also directed the 1987 fantasy film Warrior Queen, co-produced by Harry Alan Towers and Joe D'Amato, starring Sybil Danning and Donald Pleasence. In 1985, he had received a 10-picture agreement with Vestron Video, in which Vestron received key access to the titles, starting with the first project released under the 10-picture agreement, Sex Appeal.

Openly gay, Vincent died of AIDS complications on September 23, 1991. He was 51 years of age when he died, and he was living in Key West, Florida at the time of his death.

Awards 
 1982 AFAA Award for Best Director for Roommates
 1982 CFAA Award for Best Director for Roommates
 1984 AVN Award for Best Screenplay - Film for Puss 'N Boots
 1991 XRCO Hall of Fame Inductee
 1993 Free Speech Coalition Lifetime Achievement Award - Director

References

External links
 
 

1940 births
1991 deaths
American pornographic film directors
American pornographic film producers
American film directors
AIDS-related deaths in Florida
LGBT film directors
American film producers
American gay writers
LGBT people from Michigan
20th-century American businesspeople
American film editors
20th-century American screenwriters
American people of Maltese descent
20th-century American LGBT people